The Mercury Prize, formerly called the Mercury Music Prize, is an annual music prize awarded for the best album released in the United Kingdom by a British or Irish act. It was created by Jon Webster and Robert Chandler in association with the British Phonographic Industry and British Association of Record Dealers in 1992 as an alternative to the Brit Awards. The prize was originally sponsored by Mercury Communications, a brand owned by Cable & Wireless, from which the prize gets its name. It was later sponsored by Technics (1998 to 2001), Panasonic (2002 and 2003), Nationwide Building Society (2004 to 2008) and Barclaycard (2009–14). The 2015 prize was sponsored by the BBC, while in 2016 it was announced that a three-year deal had been struck with Hyundai to sponsor the event.

Any album released by a British or Irish artist, or by a band where over 50% of the members are British or Irish, may be submitted for consideration by their record label. Twelve submitted albums are shortlisted for the prize, chosen based solely on their musical merit and irrespective of how popular or successful an album or act that has been submitted may have been in the previous calendar year. The shortlist is chosen by an independent panel of musicians, music presenters, music producers, music journalists, festival organisers, and other figures in the music industry in the UK and Ireland. The prize is open to all types of music, including pop, rock, folk, urban, grime, dance, jazz, blues, electronica and classical. Presentation of the awards usually takes place at an Awards Show in October, after the shortlist is announced at the Album of the Year Launch in September. It is often observed that bands whose albums are shortlisted, or win the prize, experience a large increase in album sales, particularly for lesser known acts. Each shortlisted artist receives a specially commissioned 'Albums of the Year' trophy at the Awards Show. Unlike some other music awards, the overall winner of the Mercury Prize also receives a cheque; in 2017, the prize money was £25,000. The winner also receives an additional winner's trophy.

To date, PJ Harvey is the only artist to have won the award on more than one occasion (in 2001 and 2011). She was also the first female solo artist to receive the award. Alex Turner has received five nominations as a member of Arctic Monkeys and The Last Shadow Puppets, winning once. Thom Yorke has 6 nominations, 5 with Radiohead and one for The Eraser, but has never won.

The awards ceremony was postponed for the first, and so far only, time in 2022 following the death of Queen Elizabeth II.

Reputation

The Mercury Prize can have a considerable effect on sales for those artists who are shortlisted. Elbow saw a 700% sales increase of their album The Seldom Seen Kid after winning the Prize in 2008. In their winner's speech, Elbow's frontman Guy Garvey said that winning the Mercury Prize was 'Quite literally the best thing that has ever happened to us'. Similarly, sales of The xx's winning album rose by 450% the day after they won the 2010 Mercury Prize and 2013 winner James Blake saw a 2,500% sales increase on Amazon after he was announced as the winner of the 2013 Mercury Prize. 2011 winner PJ Harvey's album Let England Shake jumped from number 181 to 24 in the UK official charts the week after the 2011 Awards Show.

Despite being regarded by many as highly prestigious, it has been suggested that having an album nominated for or winning the Mercury Prize could be a curse on a career in music.

In 2001, the band Gorillaz requested that their eponymous debut album be withdrawn from the shortlist, with cartoon bassist Murdoc Niccals saying that winning the award would be "like carrying a dead albatross round your neck for eternity".

All genres of music are eligible for entry, and it is stated that all are treated equally, with only the music on the album being taken into account. Simon Frith, chair of the Mercury Prize judging panel, has said that albums are chosen because they are the "strongest" each year, rather than according to genre. However, the presence of classical, folk and jazz recordings has been cited by some as anomalous, arguing that comparisons with the other nominees can be invidious. Classical acts to have an album nominated have included Sir John Tavener, Sir Peter Maxwell Davies, Gavin Bryars and Nicholas Maw. None has ever won, and there has not been a shortlisted classical album since 2002.

The Mercury Prize also has a reputation for being awarded to outside chances rather than the favourites. The 1994 award winner was Elegant Slumming by the pop act M People, which some felt was a controversial decision considering the shortlist included popular albums from Britpop figureheads Paul Weller, Blur and Pulp, and electronica band The Prodigy.

Other music journalists critical of the awards stated that the 2005 award should not have been given to Antony and the Johnsons for their album I Am a Bird Now as, although they are British-born and therefore eligible for the Prize, the band were based in the United States. In 2006, Isobel Campbell's collaboration with Mark Lanegan, Ballad of the Broken Seas, was included in the shortlist, despite Lanegan being American, as the album was eligible due to Campbell's British citizenship, while Guillemots, whose album was also shortlisted in 2006, contained band members from Brazil and Canada, although the majority were from the UK.

Current eligibility criteria state that all albums must be available to buy as a digital release in the UK. In September 2013, My Bloody Valentine vocalist and guitarist Kevin Shields expressed concerns about the award in an interview with The Guardian, accusing the Mercury Prize's organisers of "banning" the band's self-released album, m b v, from the shortlist nominations and addressing the nomination criteria, which he claimed branded the album "virtually illegal".

It has also been noted that heavy metal has been overlooked by the prize.  A 2013 article by Vice on the Mercury Prize said "Metal certainly never gets a look-in, not even on the official entry information form: 'The Prize is open to all types of music, including pop, rock, folk, hip-hop, R'n'B, dance, soul, jazz, blues, electronica, classical…'" The only metal record that has ever been nominated for the Mercury Prize is Troublegum by Therapy? in 1994. In 2011, Mercury chair of judges Simon Frith said "[Metal] is a niche that a lot of people don't listen to." In 2011, The Guardian music critic Alexis Petridis agreed that the Mercury Prize underrepresented heavy metal, but argued that this actually benefitted the genre because "At least part of metal's appeal is its outsider status."

Winners and shortlisted nominees

Artists with multiple wins
2 wins
 PJ Harvey (2 wins 2001/2011, nominated 1993/1995/2001/2011)

Artists with multiple nominations
Totals listed are for bands or artists nominated more than once under the same name. It does not include appearances on compilations (e.g. Artists for War Child) or individuals nominated separately as a soloist and group member (e.g. Robbie Williams for his Life thru a Lens and Take That's Everything Changes).

5 nominations
 Radiohead (no wins, nominated 1997/2001/2003/2008/2016)

4 nominations
 Arctic Monkeys (1 win 2006, nominated 2006/2007/2013/2018)
 Laura Marling (no wins, nominated 2008/2010/2013/2020)
 PJ Harvey (2 wins 2001/2011, nominated 1993/1995/2001/2011)

3 nominations
 Anna Calvi (no wins, nominated 2011/2014/2019)
 Bat for Lashes (no wins, nominated 2007/2009/2016)
 Coldplay (no wins, nominated 2000/2003/2005)
 David Bowie (no wins, nominated 2002/2013/2016)
 Dizzee Rascal (1 win 2003, nominated 2003/2007/2010)
 Elbow (1 win 2008, nominated 2001/2008/2011)
 Florence and the Machine (no wins, nominated 2009/2015/2018)
 Foals (no wins, nominated 2010/2013/2019)
 Laura Mvula (no wins, nominated 2013/2016/2021)
 Michael Kiwanuka (1 win 2020, nominated 2012/2016/2020)
 Primal Scream (1 win 1992, nominated 1992/1994/1997)
 Pulp (1 win 1996, nominated 1994/1996/1998)
 Wolf Alice (1 win 2018, nominated 2015/2018/2021)

2 nominations
 The 1975 (no wins, nominated 2016/2019)
 Adele (no wins, nominated 2008/2011)
 alt-J (1 win 2012, nominated 2012/2017)
 Amy Winehouse (no wins, nominated 2004/2007)
 Basement Jaxx (no wins, nominated 2001/2004)
 Beth Orton (no wins, nominated 1997/1999)
 Blur (no wins, nominated 1994/1999)
 The Chemical Brothers (no wins, nominated 1997/1999)
 Doves (no wins, nominated 2000/2002)
 Eliza Carthy (no wins, nominated 1998/2003)
 Everything Everything (no wins, nominated 2011/2018)
 Ghostpoet (no wins, nominated 2011/2015)
 Guy Barker (no wins, nominated 1995/2002)
 James Blake (1 win 2013, nominated 2011/2013)
 John Tavener (no wins, nominated 1992/1997)
 Jon Hopkins (no wins, nominated 2011/2013)

 Kae Tempest (no wins, nominated 2014/2017)
 Kano (no wins, nominated 2016/2020)
 Leftfield (no wins, nominated 1995/2000)
 Little Simz (1 win 2022, nominated 2019/2022)
 Manic Street Preachers (no wins, nominated 1996/1999)
 Oasis (no wins, nominated 1995/1996)
 Paul Weller (no wins, nominated 1994/2010)
 Polar Bear (no wins, nominated 2005/2014)
 The Prodigy (no wins, nominated 1994/1997)
 Richard Hawley (no wins, nominated 2006/2012)
 Savages (no wins, nominated 2013/2016)
 Stormzy (no wins, nominated 2017/2020)
 The Streets (no wins, nominated 2002/2004)
 Suede (1 win 1993, nominated 1993/1997)
 Underworld (no wins, nominated 1996/1999)
 Villagers (no wins, nominated 2010/2013)
 The xx (1 win 2010, nominated 2010/2017)

See also
 Scottish Album of the Year Award 
 Welsh Music Prize
 Northern Ireland Music Prize
 Choice Music Prize (Ireland, including Northern Ireland)
 Polaris Music Prize (Canada)
 Prix Constantin (France)
 Shortlist Music Prize (United States)
 Australian Music Prize
 Nordic Music Prize
 Premio Ruido (Spain)
 Taite Music Prize (New Zealand)

References

General

External links
  – official site
 Mercury Prize @ BBC Online
 Mercury Prize (winners) at Discogs

British music awards
Awards established in 1992
1992 establishments in the United Kingdom
Annual events in the United Kingdom